The No 1's Tour by Irish boy band Westlife. It was seen by 330,000 fans and made £8 million worldwide. The tour was originally called The Red Carpet Tour, but the name was later changed as confusion over the type of show became apparent. The No 1's Tour took place after the band's Rat Pack album Allow Us to Be Frank. It was said to be their smallest-selling concert tour to date according to the band member Shane Filan's My Side of Life book.

Supporting acts
 Bombay Rockers

Setlist
"Uptown Girl"
"Hey Whatever"
"If I Let You Go"
"Mandy"
"Unbreakable"
"My Love"
"Swear It Again"
"When You're Looking Like That"
Medley:
"Disco Inferno"
"Oh, Pretty Woman"
"I Feel Fine"
"Don't Stop 'til You Get Enough"
"Footloose"
"Ain't That a Kick in the Head?"
"Smile"
"Mack the Knife"
Encore
"World of Our Own"
"What Makes a Man"
"Flying Without Wings"

Tour dates

Box office score data

Live Concert Music DVD

Chart performance

Certifications and sales

Personnel
 Management: Louis Walsh Management Company 
 Director: Brett Turnbull
 Producer: Robin Wilson
 Support Act: Zoo

External links

Official Westlife Website

References

Westlife concert tours
2005 concert tours